Shadows Collide With People is the fourth studio album by American musician John Frusciante, released February 24, 2004. The album was written during the recording of By the Way (2002) by Frusciante's group The Red Hot Chili Peppers and is widely regarded as his most accessible work, featuring a mix of guitar-driven alternative rock, folk ballads, and electronica. Frusciante has stated that this was his most expensive solo album to date, costing around $150,000 to produce, a significant departure from his earlier albums, which had been low-budget and recorded at his home. Frusciante noted, "I was sick and tired of people dismissing my records as being fucked-up and unprofessional."

Flea plays a double bass on "The Slaughter", the closing track of the album. All songs were written by John Frusciante, except "Omission" and "-00Ghost27" which were co-written with Josh Klinghoffer who would later replaced Frusciante in Red Hot Chili Peppers.  Klinghoffer and Frusciante share the album credits for "Vocal, Guitar, Bass, Synthesizers, Keyboards & Percussion". Shadows Collide With People is the only Frusciante solo album to feature Red Hot Chili Peppers' drummer Chad Smith.

Frusciante also made acoustic and demo versions of these tracks available to fans through his official site as an alternative to the highly-produced sound of the record.  The demo tracks feature Josh Klinghoffer on drums. A promo version of the album was also made, with the tracks "Omission", "Song to Sing When I'm Lonely", and "Failure33Object".

The album reached number 191 on the Billboard 200 and #11 on Heatseekers.

On the vinyl release of the album the words "One step away" were inscribed on side A, "There's riddles in the shadows" on side B, "A hint of sadness" on side C, and '"What they least suspect is coming next" on side D. All of these were hints to lyrics on John's next solo album The Will to Death, specifically the songs "The Will to Death" (side A), "The Days Have Turned" (sides B and D), and "Loss" (side C).

Track listing

Personnel

John Frusciante – lead and backing vocals, acoustic and electric guitar, synthesizers, bass, piano, Mellotron, producer, art direction
Josh Klinghoffer – lead vocals (on "Omission"), backing vocals, bass, electric guitar, synthesizers, keyboards, piano, mellotron, synare, vocoder, percussion, timpani
Chad Smith – drums, percussion
Flea – upright bass (on "The Slaughter")
Omar Rodríguez-López – slide guitar (on "Chances", "23 Go in to end")
Greg Kurstin – wurlitzer piano (on "Of Before")
Charlie Clouser – orchestral programming (on "Regret" and "Chances")

Production
Jim Scott – engineer, mixing
Ryan Hewitt – engineer
Dave Lee – equipment technician
Ethan Mates – engineer
Chris Holmes – assistant
Chris Ohno – assistant
Joe Mankin – assistant
Alex Marshall – assistant
Daniel Carlotta Jones – assistant
Serena Deakin – assistant
Bernie Grundman – mastering
Rene Ricard – cover painting
Vincent Gallo – photography
Richard Scane Goodheart – design

Charts

References

John Frusciante albums
2004 albums
Warner Records albums